The Doll and Dare is a 1978 bronze sculpture by Dennis Smith, installed in Salt Lake City, Utah, United States. It depicts two figure groups: a young girl standing on one pedestal and holding a doll, and another of two young boys on another pedestal, with one pulling up the other. The artwork was surveyed by the Smithsonian Institution's "Save Outdoor Sculpture" program in 1993.

References

1978 sculptures
Bronze sculptures in Utah
Outdoor sculptures in Salt Lake City